Colin 'Yic' York (1904–1973) was an Australian rugby league footballer who played in the 1920s and 1930s. He played for Yass between 1923 and 1926, spent a season with Queanbeyan in 1927 before returning to Yass in 1928 to 1930. He was born in Yass, New South Wales.  York primarily played as a prop-forward representing Australia in two test matches against Great Britain. York later played with Morpeth in the Newcastle coalfields competition and captain coached Nowra. He later moved to Sydney and became a committee man for the Canterbury RLFC.

York was selected to play for New South Wales and Australia in 1928. He continued to represent New South Wales in 1929 and 1930. In all, York played twice for Australia and six times for NSW.

References

1904 births
1973 deaths
Australia national rugby league team players
Australian rugby league players
New South Wales rugby league team players
Rugby articles needing expert attention
Rugby league players from Yass, New South Wales